Eidsvold Turnforening is a Norwegian sport club from Eidsvoll, Akershus. It has sections for association football, team handball, track and field, gymnastics and speed skating.

The club was founded as Eidsvold IL on 29 April 1910, and the name was changed to Eidsvold TF in 1912. It acquired its current stadium site, Myhrer, in 1916.

The men's football team currently plays in the Norwegian Third Division, the fourth tier of Norwegian football, having been relegated from the 2022 Norwegian Second Division.

Recent seasons

Source:

References

Official site

Football clubs in Norway
Sport in Akershus
Eidsvoll
Association football clubs established in 1910
Athletics clubs in Norway
1910 establishments in Norway